Revolutionary Socialist Party is a political party in India.

Revolutionary Socialist Party may also refer to :
 Kerala Revolutionary Socialist Party (Baby John)
 Revolutionary Socialist Party of Kerala (Bolshevik)
 Revolutionary Socialist Party (Leninist)
 Revolutionary Socialist Party of India (Marxist)

Revolutionary Socialist Party (India)